Dolichoderus doloniger is a species of ant in the genus Dolichoderus. Described by Roger in 1862, the species is endemic to Bolivia and Venezuela.

References

Dolichoderus
Hymenoptera of South America
Insects described in 1862